The Kanonenjagdpanzer (KanJPz; also known as Jagdpanzer Kanone 90mm, "tank destroyer, gun 90mm") was a West German Cold War tank destroyer. Its design was very similar to that of the World War II Jagdpanzer IV.

History
The first prototypes of the Kanonenjagdpanzer were built in 1960 by Hanomag and Henschel for West Germany and by MOWAG for Switzerland.  A second round of 6 prototypes this time built just by Hanomag and Henschel were constructed between 1962 and 1963.  After that another set of six prototypes were built over the next two years still by Hanomag and Henschel. The features of the various prototypes were then combined into the final design. 

Between 1966 and 1967, 770 units were built for the Bundeswehr, 385 by Hanomag and 385 by Henschel. Eighty of them were delivered to Belgium from April 1975 onward.

When the Soviets began deploying their T-64 and T-72 main battle tanks, the 90 mm gun was not capable of engaging them in long-range combat and the Kanonenjagdpanzer became obsolete. Although the producers claimed it could be rearmed with a 105 mm gun, between 1983 and 1985, 163 of these tank destroyers were converted into Raketenjagdpanzer Jaguar 2 anti-tank guided missile carriers by removing the gun, adding a roof-mounted TOW missile launcher and fastening further spaced and perforated armour on the hull. Some others were refitted into artillery observation vehicles by removing the main gun, so called Beobachtungspanzer, which served most particularly in the mortar units.

Some Kanonenjagdpanzer remained in service with the Heimatschutztruppe until 1991.

Design
The Kanonenjagdpanzer was a highly mobile vehicle, its survivability based on its mobility and its low profile. Its hull consisted of welded steel with a maximum thickness of 50 mm. It carried a crew of four: commander, driver, gunner and loader. Since the Kanonenjagdpanzer followed the casemate design of most World War II tank destroyers, the gun was fixed within the casemate, located a little right from the center. The 90 mm gun could only traverse 15° to the sides and elevate from −8° to +15°. It carried 51 90 mm rounds for the main gun and 4,000 7.62 mm rounds for the two MG3s. The Kanonenjagdpanzer had NBC protection and night-fighting ability.

Variants
Spähpanzer Ru 251 - variant which intended to replace the M41 Walker Bulldog.
Raketenjagdpanzer 2
Jaguar 2

Operators
  – The German Army operated a total of 770 Kanonenjagdpanzer
  – The Belgian Army operated 80 slightly modified Kanonenjagdpanzer from 1975 onwards

References

External links
 Panzerbär (de)

Tank destroyers of Germany
Military vehicles introduced in the 1960s